Salvia candelabrum is a species of flowering plant in the family Lamiaceae, native to Spain. In summer it bears violet-blue flowers on branching stems held high above the foliage.

Diterpenes have been isolated from its green tissues. From the aerial parts of Salvia candelabrum have been isolated β-sitosterol, nepeticin (lup-20(29)-ene-3j,lla-diol), candelabrone (11,12,14-trihydroxy-8,11,13-abietatriene-3,7-dione), the rearranged abietane diterpenoids candesalvone A (11,12,14-trihydroxy-19(4→3)-abeo-3,8,11,13-abietatetraen-7-one) and candesalvone B (11,12,14-trihydroxy-7-oxo-3,4-seco-4(18),8,11,13-abietatetraen-3-oic acid), and large amounts of ursolic and oleanolic acids. The root bark afforded 7α-acetoxyroyleanone, 12-O-methypisiferic acid and sugol.

This plant has ornamental value in the garden, and has gained the Royal Horticultural Society's Award of Garden Merit.

Etymology
Salvia comes from Latin and means 'healer' and is a cognate of the word 'salve'.

Candelabrum means 'candle-tree' or 'branched like a candelabra'.

References

candelabrum
Flora of Spain
Taxa named by Pierre Edmond Boissier